was a town located in Higashimorokata District, Miyazaki Prefecture, Japan.

As of 2003, the town had an estimated population of 12,621 and the density of 87.29 persons per km². The total area was 144.58 km².

On January 1, 2006, Takaoka, along with the towns of Sadowara and Tano (both from Miyazaki District), was merged into the expanded city of Miyazaki and no longer exists as an independent municipality.

External links
 Official website of Miyazaki  (automated English translation available)

Dissolved municipalities of Miyazaki Prefecture
Miyazaki (city)